Ratnakaranda śrāvakācāra is a Jain text composed by Aacharya Samantbhadra Swamy (second century CE), an acharya of the Digambara sect of Jainism. Aacharya Samantbhadra Swamy was originally from Kanchipuram, Tamil Nadu. Ratnakaranda śrāvakācāra is the earliest and one of the best-known śrāvakācāra.

A śrāvakācāra discusses the conduct of a Śrāvaka or Jain lay practitioner. Hiralal Shastri 
mentions 29 such texts from 2nd century CE to modern times.

Overview 

First verse of the Ratnakaranda śrāvakācāra is dedicated to Vardhamāna Mahāvīra, the 24th Tirthankara:

Namāh śri Vardhamāna-e nirdhutakalilātmane
Sālokānāma trilokānāma yadā-vidyā darpanāyate! (1-1)
 
Tr.- I bow to Śri Vardhamāna Mahāvīra who has washed off [all] the impurities of karmic filth from His Soul, [and]
In Whose Perception scintillate the three Worlds and the infinity of Space, as in a mirror !

Chapters 
Seven chapters or parts of the Ratnakaranda śrāvakācāra are:

Right Faith
Characteristics of Right Knowledge
Anuvrata
Guņa vratas
Śikşā vratas
Sallekhanā
Eleven Pratimas

Translation
Ratnakaranda śrāvakācāra was first translated in English language in 1917 by Champat Rai Jain. It was named "The Householder's Dharma" which means the conduct of a householder.

Notes

References
 
 P. S. Jaini, Reviewed work(s): Jaina Yoga: A Survey of the Mediaeval Śrāvakācāras by R. Williams, Bulletin of the School of Oriental and African Studies, University of London, Vol. 27, No. 3 (1964)
 Jaina yoga: a survey of the mediaeval śrāvakācāras, Volume 1 of Lala Sunder Lal Jain research series, Author R. Williams, Edition 3, Publisher Motilal Banarsidass Publ., 1991
 RATNAKARANDA SRAVAKACARA (Sanskrit-Hindi) By Acarya Samantbhadra Translated into Hindi with 2 Appendices by Dr. Jaykumar Jalaj Preface by Dr. Paul Dundas Pandit Nathuram Premi Research Series Volume 3

External links 
 Text of Ratnakarand Shravakachar Translated by Adimati Mataji
 English Translation of Ratnakarand Sravakachara
 

Jain texts
Sanskrit texts